is a town located in Itano District, Tokushima Prefecture, Japan. , the town had an estimated population of 13,105 in 5790 households and a population density of 360 persons per km².

Geography 
Itano is located in northeastern Tokushima Prefecture on the island of Shikoku. The northern part of the town is occupied by the Sanuki Mountains, and the southern part is the delta area of the Yoshino River. The Japan Median Tectonic Line fault zone, which is an active fault, runs from east to west at the boundary between the mountains and the plains.

Neighbouring municipalities 
Tokushima Prefecture
 Naruto
 Kamiita
 Aizumi
Kagawa Prefecture
 Higashikagawa

Climate
Itano has a Humid subtropical climate (Köppen Cfa) characterized by warm summers and cool winters with light snowfall.  The average annual temperature in Itano is 15.9 °C. The average annual rainfall is 1637 mm with September as the wettest month. The temperatures are highest on average in August, at around 26.7 °C, and lowest in January, at around 5.7 °C.

Demographics
Per Japanese census data, the population of Itano has remained relatively stable for the past 60 years.

History 
As with all of Tokushima Prefecture, the area of Itano was part of ancient Awa Province.  The village of Itanishi (板西村) was established within Itano District, Tokushima with the creation of the modern municipalities system on October 1, 1889. It was raised to town status on July 29, 1908. Itanishi merged with neighboring villages of Matsusaka and Sakae on February 11, 1911 and was renamed Itano.

Government
Itano has a mayor-council form of government with a directly elected mayor and a unicameral town council of 13 members. Itano, together with the other municipalities of Itano District, contributes four members to the Tokushima Prefectural Assembly. In terms of national politics, the town is part of Tokushima 2nd district of the lower house of the Diet of Japan.

Economy
Itano has primarily an agricultural economy, with rice and carrots as the main crops.

Education
Itano has three public elementary schools and one public middle schools operated by the town government and one public high school operated by the Tokushima Prefectural Department of Education. The Tokushima College of Technology is located in Itano.

Transportation

Railway
 Shikoku Railway Company – Kōtoku Line
  -  -

Highways 
  Takamatsu Expressway

Local attractions
 Konsen-ji , 3rd temple on the Shikoku Pilgrimage
 Dainichi-ji, 4th temple on the Shikoku Pilgrimage
 Jizō-ji, 5th temple on the Shikoku Pilgrimage
Tokushima Prefectural Buried Cultural Properties Research Centre

Noted people from Itano
Angela Aki, singer, songwriter

References

External links

Itano official website 

Towns in Tokushima Prefecture
Itano, Tokushima